Moi, Tituba, Sorcière…Noire de Salem (1986) (also known as I, Tituba, Black Witch of Salem) is a French novel by Maryse Condé. It won the French Grand Prix award for women's literature.

The novel was translated into English in 1992 by Richard Philcox and published under the title above, with the help of a translation grant from the National Endowment for the Humanities. The English translation includes a foreword by activist Angela Davis, who calls the book an "historical novel about the black witch of Salem". While related to the Salem witch trials, Conde's novel is a work of fiction.

Plot

In the novel Tituba is biracial, born on Barbados to a young enslaved African woman who was raped by an English sailor.  Tituba's mother is hanged after defending herself from the sexual advances of her white enslaver. Tituba is run off the plantation and becomes a maroon, having no enslaver, but not able to connect to society.  She grows up living with an old spiritual herbalist named Mama Yaya, and learning about traditional healing methods.  She falls in love and marries an enslaved man, John Indian, willing to return to slavery on his behalf.

Shortly thereafter, Tituba and John Indian are sold to Samuel Parris, the Puritan clergyman known historically for bringing about the Salem Witch Trials.  Parris takes Tituba and John Indian to Boston, then to Salem Village, where Tituba is accused of witchcraft and arrested. Tituba is thrown into a cell with a pregnant Hester Prynne, the heroine from Nathaniel Hawthorne's novel The Scarlet Letter.

Tituba survives the trials by confessing, and is sold as a servant to a Jewish merchant, Benjamin Cohen d'Azevedo. She cares for Benjamin and his nine children until the Puritans set fire to the house, killing all the children. He decides to set her free, and sends her back to Barbados.

Tituba initially stays with a group of maroons, sleeping with their leader, Christopher, who dreams of immortality.  She returns to the shack where she had lived with Mama Yaya, and works as a healing herbalist for the enslaved people in the area.  The enslaved people bring her a young man, Iphigene, who they thought would die, but Tituba nurses him back to health.  He plans a revolt against the plantation owners.  The night before the revolt, the couple are arrested. They and his followers are hanged. Tituba and Iphigene join the spirit realm, inciting future revolts whenever possible.

Reception
The novel won the French Grand Prix award for women's literature in 1986.

When it was published in English, it received excellent reviews. The Boston Sunday Globe said: "Stunning...Maryse Conde's imaginative subversion of historical records forms a critique of contemporary American society and its ingrained racism and sexism."

It also has been analyzed in literary academic journals and frequently assigned as mandatory reading in college English classes.

References

1986 French novels
1992 French novels
Salem witch trials in fiction
Novels set in Massachusetts